The 2012–13 Tunisian Ligue Professionnelle 1 (Tunisian Professional League)  season was the 87th season of top-tier football in Tunisia. The competition began on 10 November 2012 and is scheduled to conclude in June 2013. The defending champions from the previous season are Espérance Sportive de Tunis.

Team and format changes
Last season two teams were relegated as usual (AS Gabès and ES Beni-Khalled), with two teams promoted from the Tunisian Ligue Professionnelle 2 to replace them (Olympique du Kef and Stade Gabèsien). However, in a change from previous seasons, the league is now split into two groups of 8 teams.

Teams and venues

Group A

Group B

Results

Group A

Group A table

Group A result table

Group A leaders

Group B

Group B table

Group B result table

Group B leaders

Championship playoffs

League table

Result table

Leaders

Relegation playoff

ES Zarzis Relegated to 2013–14 Tunisian Ligue 2

References

External links
 2012–13 Ligue 1 on RSSSF.com

Tun
2012-13
1